was a British e-commerce company based in London that designed and sold furniture and home accessories online. The company was founded in 2010 by serial entrepreneur Ning Li and Brent Hoberman, together with Julien Callède and Chloe Macintosh.

It had offices and warehouses across Europe and Asia and operated in seven European markets including the United Kingdom, Ireland, France, Belgium, Germany, Austria, Netherlands, Switzerland and Spain.

In May 2022, it acquired the online homeware marketplace Trouva. 

On 9 November 2022,  went into administration and was acquired by the British multinational clothing, footwear and home products retailer, Next plc.

History
 was launched in March 2010 with £2.5 million funding and the organisation later received £6m in series B financing.

In January 2013,  launched in France led by digital entrepreneur David Vanek. In September 2013,  launched in Italy. In the same month Philippe Chainieux, formerly CEO of Meetic/ Match.com Europe, was appointed as managing director and  aired its first TV ad in the UK, Great Design Direct From The Makers.

In October 2013,  was selected as one of the initial 25 new UK businesses by the British government's Future Fifty programme of high-growth technology companies that the government wanted to help to expand and float. In December 2013,  co-founder and former CEO, Ning Li, accompanied the prime minister, David Cameron, and other UK business delegates on a major trade trip to China.

In September 2014,  launched in the Netherlands and six months later, in March 2015, MADE launched the site in Germany led by Gloria Maria Reuss. In March 2015, Chloe Macintosh stepped down as creative director.

In July 2015,  raised $60m (£38m) in growth capital from Partech and Eight Roads Ventures to accelerate its expansion into Europe.

In January 2017, founder Ning Li announced that he would be stepping down as chief executive of the company, but would remain involved as vice chairman of the board. The announcement came as the company reached £100m in sales.

In March 2018, after reporting another 40% year on year sales growth,  raised a further £40m equity funding from institutional investors in order to consolidate its market position in Europe.

In May 2021,  announced plans to list on the London Stock Exchange and raise approximately £100 million by selling new shares.

In June 2021,  completed its IPO on the London Stock Exchange, with a market capitalisation of £775 million.

In February 2022,  announced that CEO Philippe Chainieux had stepped down from his role as CEO with immediate effect due to personal family reasons. In March 2022, the company confirmed that Nicola Thompson would take the position of permanent CEO.

Even though  experienced a rise in sales at the beginning of 2020s, in 2022, its sales began to drop significantly, mostly due to chain supply problems, the cost-of-living crisis, and the incoming recession. That's why the company was put up for sale, with the talks for finding a potential buyer. In October 2022,  stopped taking any new orders after the talks for finding a new buyer failed, which led the company to the brink of collapse. On 1 November 2022, the company's shares on the stock market were suspended. 

On 9 November 2022,  went into administration. Its brand name, website and intellectual property are to be bought by fashion and furniture retailer Next. However, no staff are to be retained, leading to approximately 500 job losses.

Operations

 did not own any of its factories, instead it commissioned factories to meet its orders.

The company's head office was based in London and it also operated regional offices in China and Vietnam. In addition, it operated warehouse and distribution facilities at London Gateway and in Ipswich. Its UK customer services department as also headquartered in Ipswich, Suffolk.

In 2012, sales grew by 200% compared to 2011 and in 2012 it hired between one and two new employees per week.  opened its Ninth Floor Showroom, in Notting Hill during London Design Festival 2012. On 16 December 2013,  opened the doors to its showroom at Redbrick Mill in Batley. In January 2015, MADE opened its flagship showroom in Soho, London (100 Charing Cross Road).

In March 2020, the company confirmed that they were withdrawing from Denmark and Sweden to focus operation on its key markets, although it did not rule out returning in the future.

Business model
 streamlined the furniture design and manufacture process allowing it to take products from design to sale in as little as four months.  released two new collections a week. The company minimised overheads by selling online, grouping orders of the same item, not owning its factories and building close working relationships with factories and designers. Its website showcased furniture designs and encouraged people to vote for their favourite. Crowd-sourced designs went into production and people who voted could go on to purchase them should they reach production. Orders were then placed directly with the manufacturer for mass production. Once produced, these orders were shipped and then dispatched to customers. Unfortunately, this sometimes lead to significant shipping delays of more than several months for products.

Designers
 collaborated with a number of designers including Steuart Padwick, Busetti Garuti Redaelli, James Harrison, Nina Campbell, Ian Archer, Philip Colbert, Ilaria Marelli, Philippe Cramer, Genevieve Bennett, John Stefanidis and Alison Cork.

In 2013,  partnered with the Design Museum in a competition to design two-seater sofa as part of its Future Is Here exhibition. The winning entry was put into production.

References

Companies formerly listed on the London Stock Exchange
Retail companies based in London
Retail companies established in 2010
2010 establishments in England
Companies that have entered administration in the United Kingdom